Ilir Elmazovski (born 18 November 1979 in Bitola) is a Macedonian retired football player of Albanian descent who finished his career at FK Novaci in Macedonian Second League.

International career
He made his senior debut for Macedonia in a July 2000 friendly match against Azerbaijan and has earned a total of 2 caps, scoring no goals. His second and final international was a July 2001 friendly against Qatar.

References

External links
 
Profile at PlayerHistory
Football Federation of Macedonia  
Macedonian Football

1979 births
Living people
Sportspeople from Bitola
Albanian footballers from North Macedonia
Association football fullbacks
Macedonian footballers
FK Pelister players
FK Vardar players
FK Bashkimi players
FK Pobeda players
KF Shkëndija players
Macedonian First Football League players
Macedonian Second Football League players
North Macedonia international footballers